Luke Collis Sienkowski (born January 14, 1974), better known as the great Luke Ski or simply as Luke Ski, is an American parody, filk, and rap artist, who writes, records and performs comedy music. The decapitalization of "the great" in Sienkowski's stage name is his own preferred spelling, and the title has appeared as such on all of his albums to date. The name was partially inspired by the Muppets character Gonzo, who often proclaimed himself "The Great Gonzo". 

Sienkowski had the most requested song on the Dr. Demento radio show in 2002, 2003, 2011, and 2014 with his songs "Peter Parker" featuring Sudden Death, "Stealing Like a Hobbit", "Snoopy the Dogg", and "Fake Adult" respectively. Topics of his parodies have included The Lord of the Rings, Star Wars, Spider-Man, Keanu Reeves and Hamlet. Sienkowski is best known for bringing parodies of rap and hip-hop to Science Fiction conventions. He sings to pre-recorded music, often in costume or with props. Much of his work satirizes science fiction movies, television, and their marketing and are often from a fan perspective. Many of his longer works are snippets of song parodies collected together into an extended medley, such as Grease Wars or It's A Fanboy Christmas.

Since 1996, Sienkowski has released numerous albums. He is a frequent performer at science fiction and gaming conventions. He is also a caricature artist, and has done the cover art for several of his own albums (with the notable exception of UnCONVENTIONal, which features the artwork of John Kovalic).

Outside of comedy music, Sienkowski hosted the weekly show Dementia Revolution on Dementia Radio, and currently co-hosts a bi-monthly podcast with musician Carrie Dahlby called Luke and Carrie's Bad Rapport, in which the two discuss a variety of topics and regularly feature comedy music. Sienkowski also worked as a storyboard artist, writer, and voice actor of various characters on the Cartoon Network series Mighty Magiswords from 2015 to 2018, and co-hosts the animation podcast Kyle & Luke Talk About Toons with Magiswords creator Kyle A. Carrozza. He portrayed P.T. Barnum on three episodes of the narrative podcast The Radio Adventures of Dr. Floyd. He appeared as several characters in the Shockwave Radio Theater production "Let's Play Doctor" at the 2004 MarsCon.

Discography
Below is a list of all of Sienkowski's commercially released albums:

Studio albums
 Fanboys 'n Da Hood (1996)
 Shadows of the Bunghole (1997)
 Carpe Dementia (1999)
 Uber Geek (2002)
 Worst Album Ever (2003)
 UnCONVENTIONal (2005)
 BACONspiracy (2007)
 Target: Audience (2008)
 Too Much Stuff (2009)
 Be Amused by Me (2011)
 Because Of Bob: Luke Ski's Kickstarter FAWM album (songs I wrote about people for money) (2014)
 4th Grade Talent Show (2014)

Compilations
 Forgotten Fishheads Vol. 13 (2000) - rarities
 Forgotten Fishheads Vol. 27 (2000) - rarities
 Forgotten Fishheads Vol. 42 (2004) - rarities
 Forgotten Fishheads Vol. 69 (2004) - rarities
 Forgotten Fishheads Double Feature (2004) - rarities
 Psycho Potpourri (2004) - compilation
 Forgotten Fishheads Vol. Zero (2004) - rarities
 Are We Stalling For Time? (2004) - live
 Forgotten Fishheads Vol. Zero (2004) - rarities
 May The Farce Be With You (2005) - compilation
 Animation Compilation (2005) - compilation
 Trek-Wutchyalike (2006) - compilation
 What a Ripoff! Volume 1 (2008) - compilation
 Greatest Hits Volume 1: 1996-2003 (2010) - compilation
 What a Ripoff! Volume 2 (2010) - compilation
 What a Ripoff! Volume 3 (2012) - compilation
 Greatest Hits Volume 2: 2004-2009 (2015) - compilation

Produced by Luke Ski
 MarsCon 2007 Dementia Track Fund Raiser CD (2007) - produced and contributed to compilation
 MarsCon 2008 Dementia Track Fund Raiser CD (2008) - produced and contributed to compilation
 MarsCon 2009 Dementia Track Fund Raiser CD (2009) - produced and contributed to compilation
 MarsCon 2010 Dementia Track Fund Raiser CD (2010) - produced and contributed to compilation
 MarsCon 2011 Dementia Track Fund Raiser CD (2011) - produced and contributed to compilation
 MarsCon 2012 Dementia Track Fund Raiser CD (2012) - produced and contributed to compilation
 MarsCon 2013 Dementia Track Fund Raiser CD (2013) - produced and contributed to compilation
 MarsCon 2014 Dementia Track Fund Raiser CD (2014) - produced and contributed to compilation
 MarsCon 2015 Dementia Track Fund Raiser CD (2015) - produced and contributed to compilation

He has songs in several compilations featuring artists other than himself, including Technobabble, Laughter Is A Powerful Weapon Vol. 2, Dr. Demento's Basement Tapes, Volume 15 and Earpicac.

Video compilations
 The Ego Has Landed (2006)

References

External links
 the great Luke Ski
 Dr. Demento
 
 Art by Luke Ski

1974 births
Living people
American novelty song performers
American satirists
American male songwriters
Place of birth missing (living people)
American comedy musicians
American parodists
Filkers
Parody musicians
21st-century American singers
21st-century American comedians
21st-century American male singers